Nathan John Budgett (born 2 November 1975 in Newport) is a former Wales and Bristol rugby union player. Budgett announced his retirement on 15 February 2011. Before joining Bristol he played for Ebbw Vale RFC, Bridgend RFC, the defunct Celtic Warriors and then the Cardiff Blues. He is a former Wales international player, winning 12 caps between 2000 and 2002. His usual position was back-row forward.

Following his retirement, he will remain at Bristol until the end of the 2010–11 season as a forwards coach, and part of the strength and conditioning team.

References

External links
Bristol profile

1975 births
Rugby union players from Newport, Wales
Wales international rugby union players
Welsh rugby union players
Rugby union locks
Bristol Bears players
Ebbw Vale RFC players
Bridgend RFC players
Living people
Rugby union strength and conditioning coaches